Billion Dollar Limited (1942) is the third of seventeen animated Technicolor short films based upon the DC Comics character Superman. Produced by Fleischer Studios, Billion Dollar Limited centers on a train carrying one billion dollars in gold to the US mint, which is sabotaged by robbers before Superman intervenes. The short was released by Paramount Pictures on January 9, 1942.

Plot

The film starts with an image of the front page of the Daily Planet, reporting the shipment of a billion dollars of gold to the US mint. A train is being loaded with hundreds of bars of gold, guarded by several armed police officers. The locomotive is identical to the unique one used by the Twentieth Century Limited beginning in 1938. Further ahead, in a passenger coach, Lois Lane boards with help from Clark Kent, who says he wishes he could come, but he has another story to cover. As the last of the gold is loaded, a car a few hundred yards away turns on its lights, and the men inside put on robbers' masks and arm themselves. The mysterious car follows the train.

Later, a few of the robbers board the train from the back, climb to the middle, and separate several cars carrying guards from the front, leaving them stranded. Two other robbers attack the locomotive, throwing the engineer and a guard overboard, but falling off themselves as well. Lois, hearing the commotion, climbs to the engine's cab and is immediately machine-gunned from the robber's car, keeping pace with the train to the side. Lois grabs the machine gun and returns fire, only to have the bullets bounce harmlessly off of the armored car. The train continues to speed down the track, completely out of Lois' control and continually followed by the robbers. A stationmaster notices this when the train does not stop at the next station, and sends out a telegraph as signalmen change the warning lights to red, and for a railroad drawbridge to close. Finally, Clark hears the news report through the Planet's telegraph, and discreetly enters the building's storage room, changing into his Superman costume.

He arrives on the scene just as the robbers have forced the train onto a track leading to a boxcar filled with explosives. Superman manages to rip the track from the ground and guide the train back to its main course. The robbers then demolish a bridge further ahead, causing the train to fall. Superman catches the train and places it back on the track. Finally, the robbers had been throwed a massive, dangerous silver-colored, rocket-shaped bomb into the steam engine's boiler. Superman manages to pull Lois out just before the boiler explodes and both the locomotive and its tender car derail and crash to the ground below the bridge. Superman catches the lead car as it begins to roll backwards, and pulls the train up the hill himself, only to have the robbers toss several cans of tear gas at him. Coughing and choking, Superman momentarily loses control, but regains it, marching steadily up the hill despite the robbers' continued machine gun fire.

Superman pulls the train at full speed over several miles before bringing it to a safe stop at the US Mint. The Daily Planet reports the successful delivery of the money and the capture of the robbers. Reading the article, Clark says, "Uncanny how Superman turns up just when you need him". Lois replies, "I didn't even get a chance to thank him". Clark smiles.

Cast
 Bud Collyer as Clark Kent / Superman, Conductor, Gangster
 Joan Alexander as Lois Lane
 Jackson Beck as the Narrator

References

External links
 
 Billion Dollar Limited Google Video
 
 Billion Dollar Limited at the Internet Archive
 Billion Dollar Limited at the IMDb

1942 short films
1942 animated films
1940s American animated films
1940s animated short films
Superman animated shorts
Fleischer Studios short films
Short films directed by Dave Fleischer
Paramount Pictures short films
Rotoscoped films
Animated films about trains
1940s English-language films
American animated short films